Copablepharon longipenne, the dusky dune moth, is a moth of the family Noctuidae. The species was first described by Augustus Radcliffe Grote in 1882. It is found in North America from south-western Manitoba to southern Alberta, south to western Texas.

The wingspan is 35–39 mm. Adults are on wing from July to August depending on the location. There is one generation per year.

Larvae live buried about 2.5 cm deep in the soil near the host plant and apparently feed underground. The larvae pupate in the soil, emerging about two and a half weeks later.

Subspecies
Copablepharon longipenne longipenne Grote, 1882
Copablepharon longipenne serraticornis A. Blanchard, 1976

References

Noctuinae
Moths of North America